MTV's Busted is a reality TV show that depicts young adults (mostly students in college) getting arrested and penalized by police. Most arrests are for alcohol-related crimes, such as drunk driving and underage drinking. Arrests for possession of marijuana are also common. Busted began airing in summer 2008. The stories are shown from the officers' point of view with the arrested's video commentary added in.

In September 2008, the show's film crews were present during a tasering incident, which resulted in a 19-year-old young man dying at the hands of police in Lincoln, Nebraska.

References

External links

2008 American television series debuts
2008 American television series endings
2000s American reality television series
MTV original programming